Oxynoemacheilus tigris, the Tigris loach or  Halap loach, is a species of stone loach from the genus Oxynoemacheilus. This critically endangered species is endemic to the Queiq River in Turkey where it occurs ins a short stretch of stream between two reservoirs. It formerly occurred in Syria but it has been local extinction from the Syrian portion of the Queiq. This species is threatened by water abstraction and the increased frequency of droughts caused by climate change, most of the Queiq has already been desiccated. It is, however, abundant in the area it is known from where it can be found in reaches of gravel or mud substrate with moderately fast flowing to near standing water.

References

tigris
Taxa named by Johann Jakob Heckel
Fish described in 1843